Jeunesse Sportive Saint-Pierroise or JSSP is a French football club from Saint-Pierre, Réunion. Its most notable players are Roger Milla, from the Cameroon national football team and Jean Pierre Papin, from the France national football team

Achievements
Réunion Premier League: 21
1956, 1957, 1959, 1960, 1961, 1971, 1972, 1973, 1975, 1976, 1978, 1989, 1990, 1993, 1994, 2008, 2015, 2016, 2017, 2018, 2019.

Coupe de la Réunion: 11
1959, 1962, 1971, 1980, 1984, 1989, 1992, 1993 , 1994 , 2018 , 2019.

Coupe D.O.M: 3
1990, 1991, 1995

Performance in CAF competitions
CAF Champions League: 2 appearances
1997 – Second Round
2007 – withdrew in Preliminary Round

African Cup of Champions Clubs: 2 appearances
1994 – First Round
1995 – Second Round

CAF Cup: 1 appearance
2002 – First Round

The club in the French football structure
 Coupe de France: 8 appearences
1964–65 – Seventh Round
1971–72 – Seventh Round
1976–77 – Seventh Round
1977–78 – Eighth Round
1989–90 – Round of 64
2016–17 – Seventh Round
2019–20 – Round of 32
2020–21 – Eighth round

Squad

Notable players
Includes players who have played football in a European top-flight side.

 Didier Agathe
 Nicolas Alnoudji
 Jean-Pierre Bade
 Alexandru Bănuță
 El Fardou Ben Nabouhane
 Elliot Grandin
 William Gros
 Guillaume Hoarau
 Thierry Issiémou
 Roger Milla
 Pius Ndiefi
 Jean-Pierre Papin
 Dimitri Payet
 Rudison
 Djibril Cissé

References

External links
 JS Saint-Pierroise blog 
 BIENVENUE SUR LE SITE DE LA JSSP

 
Saint-Pierroise
Association football clubs established in 1950